Ernest William Lyons (5 March 1914 – 7 February 2014) was a motorcycle racer from Ireland who entered selected Grands Prix. He and Triumph factory employee Fred Clarke modified Triumph Tiger 100s for some races, with Lyons winning the 1946 Manx Grand Prix.

Their race bike's engine used lightweight aluminium components from a Triumph stationary-engine used for various wartime needs during World War II, including use on Halifax bombers for generator sets, and was also ridden by David Whitworth.

His winning motorcycle would become the prototype for the Triumph Grand Prix in 1948.

After road racing he was active as a competitive moto crosser.

Lyons died in February 2014 aged 99 at a nursing home in Kill, County Kildare, Ireland.

Career statistics

By season

References

External links
 Profile on motogp.com

1914 births
2014 deaths
350cc World Championship riders
500cc World Championship riders
Isle of Man TT riders
Irish motorcycle racers